José Cavero Samillan (born 16 August 1940) is a Peruvian hurdler. He competed in the men's 400 metres hurdles at the 1964 Summer Olympics.

References

1940 births
Living people
Athletes (track and field) at the 1963 Pan American Games
Athletes (track and field) at the 1964 Summer Olympics
Peruvian male hurdlers
Olympic athletes of Peru
Place of birth missing (living people)
Pan American Games competitors for Peru